Salute is a 2022 Indian Malayalam-language crime thriller film, directed by Rosshan Andrrews and written by Bobby-Sanjay starring Dulquer Salmaan in the lead role as a cop. Produced by Dulquer Salmaan under his banner Wayfarer Films, the film has Aslam K. Purayil as the cinematographer while A. Sreekar Prasad handles the editing and Santhosh Narayanan was signed on to compose the original background score before being replaced by Jakes Bejoy.

The film was scheduled for a theatrical release on the occasion of Sankranti in January 2022, but was indefinitely postponed later due to the rise of Omicron cases in India. Later, it was announced that the film would be skipping the theatrical release and decided for a direct-to-streaming release on SonyLIV. It was set to have the world premiere on 18 March 2022, but premiered a day early, on 17 March 2022. The film marks Diana Penty's Malayalam debut. It received mixed reviews from critics.

Premise
Aravind Karunakaran a sub-inspector, along with his colleagues and superior, Deputy Superintendent Ajith Karunakaran, who is also his brother, arrest a man named Murali, who they are convinced was a murderer they were looking for, forging evidences against him. However, they discover to their shock soon after that the real murderer was someone else. While Ajith and the others are in solidarity over keeping silence about their misconduct, lest they risk their careers, Aravind retires from the force after refusing to be a part of the charade and getting condemned by his colleagues for the same. A few years later, when Aravind returns to his hometown for his niece's wedding, he discovers certain leads that can lead him to the actual culprit, thereby saving Murali. Aravind then rejoins the force and begins to conduct the investigation on his own time, narrowing on a potential serial killer and identity thief who has been behind several murders around Kerala over the years.

Cast

Production

Development
In May 2020, during the seven year anniversary of film Mumbai Police, director Rosshan Andrrews announced that he would be teaming up with Dulquer Salmaan for his next film which is a thriller. The film's story and screenplay is written by his regular collaborators Bobby & Sanjay marking their sixth film together.

Filming
The principal photography began on 3 February 2021, in Kollam, Kerala, India. Diana Penty joined the sets on 9 February 2021 marking her debut in Malayalam film. Manoj K Jayan joined the shooting on 12 February 2021. The major locations are Trivandrum, Kollam, Kasargode, and New Delhi.

Release
Salute released on SonyLiv on 17 March 2022 as a Direct-to-OTT release. The film was originally planned to release in April 2021, but was postponed multiple times due to waves of the COVID-19 pandemic in India. The premiere was rescheduled multiples times, including for October 2021, December 2021, and January 2022.

Controversies
On 15 March 2022, ahead of the film's release, the Film Exhibitors United Organisation of Kerala (FEUOK), banned Dulquer Salmaan's movies from releasing in theatres anymore since the lead actor, producer, makers had violated the rules and given the film out for a direct OTT release even though they had confirmed that it would have a theatrical release first. They also banned Wayfarer Films and Dulquer Salmaan projects. They said the ban would be permanent and refused to co-operate with Dulquer. Later the ban was withdrawn by them.

Reception
In a review for Firstpost, Anna M. M. Vetticad rated the film 3 out of 5 stars and wrote, “For the most part, Salute remains engaging (...) Somewhere in the second half though, the narrative begins to stretch itself, mistaking length for ruminativeness and needless additional seconds for detail.” The Times of India gave 3.5/5 and wrote ," A cop drama with a difference." Rediff.com gave 3.5/5 and wrote, "Salute explores narratives of police brutality and unethical practices, power-hungry politicians who will stop at nothing and the helplessness of innocent victims of crime, observes Divya Nair". The News Minute gave 3.5/5 and wrote, "Dulquer's thriller is an engaging police procedural". Filmibeat gave 3/5 and wrote, "Salute is a realistic, unconventional, and intriguing cop drama that dares to take a different route. This Dulquer Salmaan starrer is definitely worth a watch". The Quint gave 3/5 and wrote, "Dulquer Salmaan's Gripping Thriller Deserves a Salute, Almost". Pinkvilla gave 3/5 and wrote, "A cold, detached character study in the guise of a crime procedural". "Janani K of India Today gave the film a rating of 3/5 and wrote "Dulquer Salmaan's riveting cop drama is replete with new ideas". Shilpa Nair Anand of The Hindu commented "Dulquer Salmaan scores with his restrained performance as a cop". Mirchi9 gave 2.5/5 and wrote, " Dulquer's thriller is an engaging police procedural". Indian Express Reviewed "Dulquer Salmaan shines in absorbing investigative drama".

References

External links

2020s Malayalam-language films
2022 crime thriller films
Indian thriller drama films
Films directed by Rosshan Andrrews
Indian direct-to-video films
2022 direct-to-video films
Fictional portrayals of the Kerala Police
Direct-to-video thriller films
SonyLIV original films
Indian police films
Films about police officers
Films about identity theft
Films about miscarriage of justice
Films shot in Kollam
Films shot in Thiruvananthapuram
Films shot in Thrissur
Films scored by Jakes Bejoy